The men's hammer throw event at the 1986 World Junior Championships in Athletics was held in Athens, Greece, at Olympic Stadium on 18 and 19 July.  A 7257g (senior implement) hammer was used.

Medalists

Results

Final
19 July

Qualifications
18 Jul

Group A

Participation
According to an unofficial count, 28 athletes from 20 countries participated in the event.

References

Hammer throw
Hammer throw at the World Athletics U20 Championships